Aghavnavank is a village in the Dilijan Municipality of the Tavush Province in Armenia. 

A hiking trail featuring the 12th/13th-century Aghavnavank Monastery, and a yew grove of the Dilijan National Park is located near the village.

Notable people

Gallery

References

External links 

Populated places in Tavush Province